Diane L. Carey-Brodeur (born October 2, 1954) is an American fiction writer, publishing under the pen names Lydia Gregory, Diane Carey, and D. L. Carey.

Background
Diane L. Carey was born on October 2, 1954 in Flint, Michigan, United States. She married Gregory E. "Greg" Brodeur, an editor, and they had  three children: Lydia, Gordon, and Ben. The family lives in Michigan.

Carey's first publication was a romance novel written under the pseudonym of Lydia Gregory. Her later writings have been published under two variants of her maiden name: Diane Carey and D. L. Carey. She has also written children's novels, but is best known for her work in the Star Trek franchise. She has been the lead-off writer for two Star Trek spin-off book series: Star Trek: The Next Generation with Star Trek: Ghost Ship, and the novelization of the Star Trek: Enterprise pilot, Broken Bow. Carey's literary work has been recognized and highlighted at Michigan State University in their Michigan Writers Series.

Bibliography

As Lydia Gregory

Historical Romance Novels
 Unwilling Enchantress (1982)

As Diane Carey

Historical Romance Novels
 Silver Season (1985)
 Harem (1986)
 Under the Wild Moon (1986)
 After the Torchlight (1986)
 Sudden Storm (1990)
 Rose Legacy (1992)

Star Trek Original Series
 Dreadnought! (1986) #29; Fortunes of War 1
 Battlestations! (1986) #31; Fortunes of War 2
 Final Frontier (1988)
 Best Destiny (1992)
 The Great Starship Race (1993) #67
 First Frontier (1995) #75; co-author Dr. James I. Kirkland
 First Strike (1996) #79; Invasion! #1
 Cadet Kirk (1996) Starfleet Academy #3
 Starfleet Academy (1997)
 Wagon Train to the Stars (2000) #89; New Earth #1
 Belle Terre (2000) #90; New Earth #2; co-author Dean Wesley Smith
 Challenger (2000) #94; New Earth #6
 Chainmail (2001) Gateways #2
 What Lay Beyond (2001) Gateways #7; co-authors Peter David, Keith R A DeCandido

Star Trek: The Next Generation Series
 Ghost Ship (1988) #1
 Descent (1993) (novelization)
 Ship of the Line (1997)
 Ancient Blood (1997) Day of Honor #1
 Red Sector (1999) Double Helix #3

Star Trek Deep Space Nine Series
 The Search (1994) (novelization)
 Station Rage (1995) #13
 The Way of the Warrior (1995) (novelization)
 Trials and Tribble-ations (1996) co-author David Gerrold (novelization)
 The Dominion War (1998)
 Call to Arms (1998) The Dominion War #2
 ...Sacrifice of Angels (1998) The Dominion War #4
 What You Leave Behind (1999) (novelization)

Star Trek Voyager Series
 Flashback (1996) co-author Brannon Braga (novelization)
 Fire Ship (1998) novella in collection Star Trek: The Captain's Table (1998)
 Equinox (1999) (novelization)
 Endgame (2001) (novelization) co-author Christie Golden (not to be confused with End Game by Peter David)
 Unimatrix Zero (2001) (novelization)

Star Trek Enterprise Series
 Broken Bow (2001) (novelization)

Aliens Series
 DNA War (2006)
 Cauldron (2007)

Movie Novelizations
 S.W.A.T (2003)

As D. L. Carey

Civil War Series (Historical Romance Novels)
 Distant Drums (1991)
 Rise Defiant (1991)

Distress Call 911 Series (Young Adult Books)
 Twist of Fate (1996)
 Buried Alive (1996)
 Danger Zone (1996)
 Worth Dying For (1996)
 Million Dollar Mistake (1996)
 Roughing It (1996)
 Promise Me You'll Stop Me (1996)

Other
 Do You Have a Beaumont Doctor? Huron River Press (2011)
 How to Help Stray Pets and Not Get Stuck (2013)
 Banners (2013)

References

External links
 

1954 births
Living people
Writers from Flint, Michigan
American romantic fiction writers
American science fiction writers
20th-century American novelists
21st-century American novelists
20th-century American women writers
21st-century American women writers
Women science fiction and fantasy writers
Women romantic fiction writers
American women novelists
Novelists from Michigan